Ben Stille (born November 12, 1997) is an American football defensive end for the Cleveland Browns of the National Football League (NFL). He played college football at Nebraska and was signed by the Miami Dolphins as an undrafted free agent in 2022.

Career

Miami Dolphins
On April 30, 2022, Stille signed with the Dolphins as an undrafted free agent following the 2022 NFL Draft.  On August 30th, 2022, the Dolphins released Stille,  On September 1st, 2022, Stille was signed to the Dolphins practice squad.  On October 22, 2022, the Dolphins elevated Stille to the active roster. On October 23, Stille made his NFL debut playing 9 snaps and totaling 2 tackles.

Cleveland Browns
On November 15, 2022, the Cleveland Browns signed Stille off the Dolphins practice squad.

References

1997 births
Living people
Players of American football from Nebraska
American football defensive ends
Nebraska Cornhuskers football players
Miami Dolphins players
Cleveland Browns players